Mohamed Kamal Fadel is the Polisario Front representative of the Sahrawi Arab Democratic Republic (SADR) to Australia & New Zealand. He had worked since 1986 in several diplomatic postings, as on SADR embassies or representations on Algeria, India, Iran, the United Kingdom & East Timor. In 1999 he was appointed as Sahrawi representative to Australia & New Zealand and also as roving ambassador for the South Pacific region. He holds an MA in International Relations from the University of Kent, United Kingdom. He speaks Hassaniya (a variety of Arabic), English, French and Spanish.

Diplomatic postings 
1995–1999 Adjunt POLISARIO representative for the United Kingdom & Ireland
1999–current POLISARIO representative for Australia & New Zealand
2009–2010 SADR ambassador for East Timor

References 

Polisario Front politicians
Sahrawi Sunni Muslims
Living people
Ambassadors of the Sahrawi Arab Democratic Republic to East Timor
Ambassadors of the Sahrawi Arab Democratic Republic to Australia
Ambassadors of the Sahrawi Arab Democratic Republic to New Zealand
Alumni of the University of Kent
Year of birth missing (living people)
Place of birth missing (living people)
Ambassadors of the Sahrawi Arab Democratic Republic to Iran